Nemichthys curvirostris, the boxer snipe eel, is a snipe eel of the family Nemichthyidae. Like other snipe eels, they have incredibly narrow and elongated bodies, and small fins.

Habitat
The eel lives at depths of up to 2,000 m. It has a probable global distribution.

Description
It has long, narrow fine-boned delicate jaws, which are curved, and have small hooked teeth for swiping crustaceans, zooplankton, and sea snow from the water column. This eel is extremely delicate at touch, with a somewhat smooth, slimy skin, and diminutive eyes which are positioned near the rear end of the jaws.

Biology
Feeds on crustaceans like amphipods, copepods, shrimp, and possibly also consumes fish eggs and sea snow.  Reproduction is oviparous.

References

External links
Nemichthys curvirostris, boxer snipe eel  1 20 Feb. 2009 http://www.fishbase.org/summary/SpeciesSummary.php?id=9107.

curvirostris
Taxa named by Pehr Hugo Strömman
Fish described in 1896